Sofía Mulánovich Aljovín (born 24 June 1983) is a Peruvian surfer. She is a 3-time World Surfing Champion, 1 WSL and 2 ISA world championships,. She is the first Peruvian surfer ever to win a World Surf League World Championship Tour event (ex ASP) and the first Latin American ever to win the World Title, which she did in 2004. In 2004, she won three out of the six World Championship Tour events, and finished the season as  Absolute World Champion. Sofia is the only one Latin-american surfer to win 2 ISA World Championships. Sofia won the ISA Championships, 2004 in Salinas-Ecuador and 2019 in Miyazaki-Japan. Her main sponsor is Roxy.

Mulánovich was inducted into Surfing Hall of Fame in 2007 due to her achievement in 2004 and 2005. In 2004, she became the first South American and Latin American (man or woman) to ever win the world title. Sofia’s list of credits to date is impressive, having won the Vans Triple Crown of Surfing, U.S. Open of Surfing and the Surfer Poll (2004 and 2005)

Early life 
Sofía Mulánovich Aljovín was born in Punta Hermosa, Lima, Peru.

On 27 July 2007, Mulánovich was inducted into the Surfers Hall of Fame in Huntington Beach, California, United States. She is the first South American to have this honor, and was chosen for having had a major impact on the sport by her outstanding achievements. In 2015, she was also inducted into the Surfing Walk of Fame in Huntington Beach. Also in 2015 in a collaboration with Swatch, she opened a surfing academy (Proyecto Sofia Mulanovich) for youths from all backgrounds, in her home town of Punta Hermosa in Lima.

Achievements

2019
 2019 1st Place ISA World Surfing Games
2016
 2016 1st Place QS Maui and Sons Pichilemu Women's Pro
2009
 2009 1st Place Movistar Peru Classic (WCT)
 2009 1st place Copa Movistar, Peru (WQS)
2008
 2009 2nd Place Billabong Girls Pro Rio
 2008 2nd Place Rip Curl Pro, Australia
 2008 1st Place Roxy Pro Gold Coast, Australia
2007
 2007 Inducted into Surfing Hall of Fame
 2007 1st Place Roxy Pro Sunset Beach, Hawaii
 2007 1st Place Rip Curl Girls Festival Europe, Spain
 2007 2nd Place Rip Curl Pro Bells Beach, Australia
 2007 2nd Place World Championship Tour
2006
 2006 Vans Triple Crown of Surfing Champion (récord)
 2006 5th Place World Championship Tour
 2006 1st Place US Open of Surfing Huntington Beach, California (WQS)
 2006 2nd Place Billabong Girls Itacare, Brasil (WQS)
 2006 1st Place OP Pro Hawaii Haleiwa, Oahu (WQS)
 2006 Teen Choice Award won – Choice Action Sports Female
2005
 2005 ESPY Best Action-Sports Athlete
 2005 2nd Place World Championship Tour
 2005 1st Place Roxy Pro UK, United Kingdom
 2005 1st Place Roxy Pro Tavarua, Fiji
 2005 1st Place Rip Curl Pro Bells Beach, Australia
 2005 3rd Place Telefónica Cup Asia Beach, Peru
 2005 3rd Place Billabong Pro Teahupoo, Tahiti
2004
 2004 1st Place ISA Women's World Championship 
2004 1st Place WSL Women's World Championship Tour
 2004 1st Place Rip Curl Girls Festival Europe, France
 2004 1st Place Billabong Pro Teahupoo, Tahiti
 2004 1st Place Roxy Pro, Fiji
2003
 2003 3rd Place WCT Roxy ProTavarua, Fiji
 2003 2nd Place WQS Roxy Pro Phillip Island, Australia
 2003 2nd on the World Qualifying Series (WQS)
 2003 7th on the World Championship Tour (WCT)
 2003 Voted Number 5 Top Female Surfer, Surfer Poll Award
2002
 2002 2nd Place WQS ASP Turtle Bay, Hawaii
 2002 2nd Place WCT Roxy Pro South West Coast, France
 2002 4th Place WQS Rip Curl Pro Hossegor, France
 2002 3rd Place WQS US Open of Surfing Huntington Beach, CA
 2002 Qualified for the 2003 World Championship Tour
 2002 Ranked 2nd on WQS Tour
 2002 Voted by Surfer Magazine as the Number 1 Female Grommet (a.k.a. Best Upcoming Female Surfer)
 2002 Four-Time Peruvian National Champion 1999–2002

Filmography
Peel: The Peru Project (2006) (V) as Surfer
Sofia: A Documentary (2006), as herself
The Modus Mix (2003) (V)
7 Girls (2001) documentary
Into The Storm/En La Tormenta (2020) documentary, as herself (Director: Adam Brown)

Personal life
She is openly lesbian and welcomed a son with her girlfriend Camila Toro.

References

External links

 Sofia Mulanovich Surfers Hall of Fame
 "Sofia Mulanovich", Surfline

1983 births
World Surf League surfers
Living people
Peruvian surfers
Peruvian people of Croatian descent
Female surfers
People from Lima Province
Peruvian sportswomen
Olympic surfers of Peru
Surfers at the 2020 Summer Olympics